Petar Tale (born August 15, 1947) is a Norwegian painter. He was born Petar Pavicevic in Montenegro but has been living in Norway since 1977. Tale's art work consist of drawings, watercolours and paintings. The motives are both figurative - landscapes, people - and non-figurative. He established Lillestrøm kunstmuseum - Tale Art Museum in the mid 1980s.

External links
Tale Art Museum official website 
Book information Amazon: The Art of Petar Tale 
Microfilmaker Magazine: Filmcritique of the documentary film That I Stay For

1947 births
Living people
20th-century Norwegian painters
21st-century Norwegian painters
Norwegian male painters
20th-century Norwegian male artists
21st-century Norwegian male artists